Matheus Menezes Jácomo (born 12 January 1991) is a Brazilian former footballer who played as a defender.

Personal life
Matheus's brother Felipe Menezes is also a footballer. A midfielder, he too was groomed at Goiás.

Career statistics

References

External links

1991 births
Sportspeople from Goiânia
Living people
Brazilian footballers
Association football defenders
Goiás Esporte Clube players
Botafogo de Futebol e Regatas players
Associação Desportiva Recreativa e Cultural Icasa players
Tombense Futebol Clube players
Associação Atlética Aparecidense players
America Football Club (Rio de Janeiro) players
Campo Grande Atlético Clube players
Batatais Futebol Clube players
FC Dordrecht players
S.R. Almancilense players
Campeonato Brasileiro Série A players
Campeonato Brasileiro Série D players
Eerste Divisie players
Campeonato de Portugal (league) players
Brazilian expatriate footballers
Expatriate footballers in the Netherlands
Brazilian expatriate sportspeople in the Netherlands
Expatriate footballers in Portugal
Brazilian expatriate sportspeople in Portugal